The Voyage to America (French: Le Voyage en Amérique) is a 1951 French comedy film directed by Henri Lavorel and starring Pierre Fresnay, Yvonne Printemps and Jean Brochard. The film contrasts the prosperity of France and the United States in the post-Second World War era It replaced the Laurel and Hardy film Atoll K at the Olympia cinema in Paris, and was much more successful.

Synopsis
A couple living a peaceful life in rural France, learn that their daughter who married an American GI is due to give birth to a grandchild. They head to the United States to visit, to the delight of the wife.

Cast 
 Pierre Fresnay as  Gaston Fournier
 Yvonne Printemps as  Clotilde Fournier
 Jean Brochard as  the mayor
 Claude Laydu as  François Soalhat
 Olivier Hussenot as Mr Soalhat, the gardener
 Jane Morlet as Marie
 Yvette Etievant as  the post clerk
 Lisette Lebon as  Marguerite
 Claire Gérard as  Mrs Tassote
 Maurice Jacquemont as  the priest
 Pierre Destailles as  the cook
 Christian Fourcade as  the rascal
 Madeleine Barbulée as  the housekeeper
 Louis de Funès as the employee of Air France
 Léon Larive as Le caissier
 Eugène Frouhins as L'huissier
 Gabriel Gobin as Employé du car
 Émile Genevois as Le facteur
 Fernand Gilbert as 	Le client de la banque
 Jean Valmence as 	L'architecte

References

Bibliography
 Aping, Norbert. The Final Film of Laurel and Hardy: A Study of the Chaotic Making and Marketing of Atoll K. McFarland, 2014.
 Prime, Rebecca. Hollywood Exiles in Europe: The Blacklist and Cold War Film Culture. Rutgers University Press, 2014.

External links 
 

1951 films
French comedy films
1950s French-language films
French black-and-white films
Films with screenplays by Roland Laudenbach
1951 comedy films
1950s French films